The T.E. Mcfield Sports Centre is a multi-use sports stadium in George Town, Cayman Islands.

In 2011 and 2012, the stadium hosted a group in the CFU Club Championship.

Football venues in the Cayman Islands
Buildings and structures in George Town, Cayman Islands